Repati Pourulu is a 1986 Indian Telugu-language action film written and directed by T. Krishna. The film stars Vijayashanti and Rajasekhar while Anuradha and Y. Vijaya play supporting roles. It has music composed by K. Chakravarthy. The film won two Nandi Awards and the Filmfare Award for Best Film – Telugu.

Plot

Cast 
 Vijayashanti
 Rajasekhar
 Anuradha
 Suthi Velu
 Rallapalli
 P. L. Narayana
 Kota Srinivasa Rao
 Narra Venkateswara Rao
 Y. Vijaya
 G. Ashok

Soundtrack 
K. Chakravarthy composed the score and soundtrack with lyrics by C. Narayana Reddy, Jaladi, and Vangapandu Prasada Rao.

Accolades 
Filmfare Awards South – 1986
 Filmfare Award for Best Film – Telugu – P. Venkateswara Rao.

Nandi Awards – 1986
 Second Best Feature Film – Silver – Ramoji Rao
 Best Supporting Actor – P. L. Narayana

References

External links 
 

1980s Telugu-language films
1986 action films
1986 films
Films directed by T. Krishna
Films scored by K. Chakravarthy
Indian action films